Hjalmar Selander (2 July 1859 – 10 August 1928) was a Swedish actor, stage director and theatre manager.

Biography
Selander was born in  Mölndal Municipality in Västra Götaland, Sweden. He made his debut at the Stora teatern in Göteborg during 1878.
Selander was active in Gothenburg during 1877–1879, in various travelling theatre companies from 1879 until 1888 and the Swedish Theatre (Stockholm) during 1888–89.  In 1890, he started his own theater company. From 1909 until 1925, Selander was head of the Nya teatern  at Järntorget, Gothenburg. 

He was married  in 1887 to  actress Concordia Selander (1861–1935), with whom he for many years ran the notable Selander Company. He died in Stockholm and was buried at Norra begravningsplatsen.

References

Other sources
Svenskt porträttgalleri

1859 births
1928 deaths
People from Mölndal Municipality
Swedish male stage actors
Swedish theatre directors
Swedish male film actors
Swedish male silent film actors
20th-century Swedish male actors

Burials at Norra begravningsplatsen